The BMW K1300S is a motorcycle introduced in October 2008.
It replaced the outgoing K1200S which had been in production since September 2004. The K1300S features an increase in engine capacity of 136cc over the K1200S, an increase in power to 175 hp (130 kW), newly styled fairings and a new exhaust system. Motorcyclist tested a quarter mile time of 10.62 sec. @ 133.03 mph.
  Production ended in 2016.

References

Motorcycles introduced in 2008
K1300S
Shaft drive motorcycles
Vehicles discontinued in 2016